Else Christophersen (11 February 1915 – 3 July 1968) was a Norwegian equestrian. She was born in Kristiania. She competed in equestrian at the 1956 Summer Olympics in Stockholm, where she placed 13th in individual mixed dressage, and seventh in the team competition (along with Anne-Lise Kielland and Bodil Russ).

References

External links

1915 births
1968 deaths
Sportspeople from Oslo
Norwegian female equestrians
Norwegian dressage riders
Equestrians at the 1952 Summer Olympics
Equestrians at the 1956 Summer Olympics
Olympic equestrians of Norway
Norwegian sportswomen
20th-century Norwegian women